Selinur (minor planet designation: 500 Selinur) is a minor planet orbiting the Sun. Like 501 Urhixidur and 502 Sigune, it is named after a character in Friedrich Theodor Vischer's then-bestseller satirical novel Auch Einer.

References

External links 
 Lightcurve plot of 500 Selinur, Palmer Divide Observatory, B. D. Warner (2009)
 Asteroid Lightcurve Database (LCDB), query form (info )
 Dictionary of Minor Planet Names, Google books
 Asteroids and comets rotation curves, CdR – Observatoire de Genève, Raoul Behrend
 Discovery Circumstances: Numbered Minor Planets (1)-(5000) – Minor Planet Center
 
 

000500
Discoveries by Max Wolf
Named minor planets
19030116